Mansfield Thornton House is a historic home located near Warrenton, Warren County, North Carolina.  It was built about 1885, and is a two-story, three bay by one bay, post-Greek Revival style frame dwelling.  It is sheathed in weatherboard, sits on a rubble foundation, has a hipped roof, and one-story hip roofed front porch.  It was built for former slave Mansfield Thornton.

It was listed on the National Register of Historic Places in 1977.

References 

African-American history of North Carolina
Houses on the National Register of Historic Places in North Carolina
Greek Revival houses in North Carolina
Houses completed in 1885
Houses in Warren County, North Carolina
National Register of Historic Places in Warren County, North Carolina